is a railway station on the Keisei Oshiage Line in Sumida, Tokyo, Japan, operated by the private railway operator Keisei Electric Railway.

Lines

Station layout
This station has one island platform and one side platform serving three tracks.

Platforms

History
It was renamed Yahiro Station on 1 April 1994.

Station numbering was introduced to all Keisei Line stations on 17 July 2010; Yahiro was assigned station number KS47.

See also
 List of railway stations in Japan

References

Railway stations in Tokyo
Railway stations in Japan opened in 1923